Phway Phway (born Shwe Yee Ko Oo on 9 August 1988) is a three-time Myanmar Academy Award winning Burmese film actress. She is the Myanmar's highest-paid actress and considered one of the most commercially successful actresses in Burmese cinema. She is talking top actress in Burma.

Phway won her first Myanmar Academy Award in 2012 with the film Let Pan, achieved her second award in 2015 with the film I'm Rose, Darling and third award in 2018 with the film Shwe Kyar. All films were directed by four-time Myanmar Academy Award winner Wyne.

Early life and education
Phway Phway was born on 9 August 1988 in Mogok, Burma to parent Mg U and his wife Theingi. She attended high school at the Kamayut 2 High School from 1993 to 2004, and graduated from University of Foreign Languages, Yangon with a Bachelor of Arts degree in Korean in 2008.

Career
Phway Phway had a great interest in becoming a singer as a child. She and her friends formed a band, "Art of Depression" with her as a vocalist. At university, she began modeling; her first modeling opportunity was for the MAX Calendar in 2007 with the name "Shwe Yee Ko Oo" which is her birth name. Then she named herself as "Phway Phway" as her actress name. Her modeling career led to appearing in music videos and TV commercials, and direct-to-video films. She starred in over 100 video films and appeared on many magazine covers. She was awarded a successful new face actor in 2009 People Magazine Award and the best leading actress in "Lat Pan" movie (which was her very first movie) in Myanmar Academy Awards 2012. 

She created her first MTV called MyWorld in August 2020.

Personal life
Besides acting, singing and modeling, Phway Phway also has great interest in fashion designing. She believes that if she was not involved in the entertainment industry, she would have studied fashion and created her own label. She is the cousin of Myanmar model and actress Wut Hmone Shwe Yee. Phway Phway was listed as the Second Youngest Academy Award Winner after Soe Pyae Thazin. Phway Phway's fan called her "Phway Sein".

Political activities
Following vthe aftermath of the 2021 Myanmar coup d'état, Phway Phway was active in the anti-coup movement both in person at rallies and through social media. Denouncing the military coup, she has taken part in protests since February. She joined the "We Want Justice" three-finger salute movement. The movement was launched on social media, and many celebrities have joined the movement. She donated 144 meals of butter rice and chicken curry to the protesters. She also donated 15 lakh Burmese Kyats to government employees who involved in CDM, to commemorate General Aung San's ‌birthday on 13 February 2021.

On 3 April 2021, warrants for her arrest were issued under section 505 (a) of the Myanmar Penal Code by the State Administration Council for speaking out against the military coup. Along with several other celebrities, she was charged with calling for participation in the Civil Disobedience Movement (CDM) and damaging the state's ability to govern, with supporting the Committee Representing Pyidaungsu Hluttaw, and with generally inciting the people to disturb the peace and stability of the nation.

Filmography

Direct-to-video

Films (Big Screen Movies)

Awards and nominations

References

1988 births
Living people
Burmese film actresses
21st-century Burmese actresses
Burmese female models
People from Yangon